Shankar Shambhu is a 1976 Bollywood action film starring Feroz Khan, Vinod Khanna & Sulakshana Pandit in the lead roles. It is directed by Chand and produced by A. K. Nadiadwala.

Plot
Inspector Ranjit Singh lives a middle-classed lifestyle along with his wife, Laxmi, a son, Pappu, and daughter, Pinky. When the National Bank is broken into one night, he gives chase to the robbers, and shoots one of them dead. The dead robber's brother, Kundan, manages to get away with the loot, then tracks down Ranjit and his family, shoots at them, forcing their jeep to fall into the Narbada river, separating the entire family. Ranjit manages to rescue Laxmi, and then apprehends Kundan, has him tried in Court, and sentenced to jail for several years, but is unable to recover the stolen loot. Years later, Kundan gets discharged and is received by his nephew, Chaman. Ranjit is now the Inspector General of Police, and Laxmi still hopes to be reunited with her children. Pappu has been adopted by a bandit named Lakhan Singh, who re-names him Shambhu, and brings him up with his other son, Shankar. Pinky has been adopted by a widow, who has re-named her Sulakshana, who makes a living as a petty thief. Shankar and Shambhu, on the run from the Police, end up in Bombay, where they will be thrust into conflict with Kundan and Chaman on the one hand, and Ranjit Singh on the other.

Cast
Feroz Khan as Shankar Singh "Bade Thakur"
Vinod Khanna as Pappu Singh / Shambhu Singh "Chhote Thakur" 
Sulakshana Pandit as Pinky Singh / Sulakshana "Sulu" 
Bindu as Munni Bai 
Ajit as Inspector / I.G.P. Ranjeet Singh 
Sulochana Latkar as Laxmi Singh
Bhagwan as Constable Dhondu 
Jagdeep as Constable Naik
Lalita Pawar as Pinky's Foster Mother
Pradeep Kumar as Lakhan Singh
Anwar Hussain as Kundan
Kundan as  Kundan's Brother
Viju Khote as Kundan's Goon 
Sudhir as Chaman 
Jayshree T. as Courtesan from Jaunpur

Songs
All songs are written by Sahir Ludhianvi & music by Kalyanji-Anandji.

External links

References

1976 films
Indian crime action films
1970s Hindi-language films
1976 Western (genre) films
1970s crime action films
Indian Western (genre) films
Films scored by Kalyanji Anandji